Playing Favorites is the twenty-third album by American singer-songwriter Michael Martin Murphey. Released August 21, 2001, the album features completely new recordings of eleven of the artist's country, cowboy, and popular crossover classics, as well as one new song. In his liner notes, Murphey writes that "songs are like children; they grow, evolve, change with time." The concept behind Playing Favorites was to document the growth and evolution of his best-loved tunes, using many new musicians and modern recording techniques not available when the original recordings were done.

Critical reception

In his review on the Allmusic web site, Jonathan Widran gave the album four and a half out of five stars, praising the music's "warmth and familiarity" and the way the new recordings capture "the romance and adventurous Western spirit" of Murphey's career.

Track listing
 "Carolina in the Pines" (Murphey) – 4:35
 "Adobe Walls" (Brown, Reed) – 3:43
 "Cherokee Fiddle" (Murphey) – 4:08
 "A Long Line of Love" (Overstreet, Schuyler) – 3:25
 "All The Dancing Horses" (Murphey, Murphey) – 4:21
 "Fiddlin' Man" (Murphey, Norman, Rains) – 3:57
 "Cowboy Logic" (Cook, Rains) – 3:40
 "I'm Gonna Miss You Girl" (Winchester) – 4:09
 "From The Word Go" (Garvin, Waters) – 3:14
 "Geronimo's Cadillac" (Murphey, Quarto) – 5:05
 "What's Forever For" (Van Hoy) – 2:54
 "Wildfire" (Murphey, Cansler) – 4:59

Credits
Music
 Michael Martin Murphey – vocals, guitar, producer, liner notes
 Pat Flynn – guitar
 Chris Leuzinger – guitar
 Sonny Garrish – steel guitar
 Richard Bailey – banjo
 Sam Bush – mandolin
 Jonathan Yudkin – fiddle
 Joey Miskulin – accordion, producer
 David Hoffner – piano, synthesizer
 Craig Nelson – bass
 Bob Mater – drums, percussion
 Ryan Murphey – background vocals

Production
 Gary Paczosa – engineer
 Denny Purcell – mastering
 Keith Compton – mixing
 Eric Conn – editing

References

External links
 Michael Martin Murphey's Official Website

2001 albums
Michael Martin Murphey albums
Western music (North America) albums